Richard Peacock may refer to:
 Richard Peacock (1820–1889), English engineer
 Richard Peacock (footballer) (born 1972), English footballer